A rubbing (frottage) is a reproduction of the texture of a surface created by placing a piece of paper or similar material over the subject and then rubbing the paper with something to deposit marks, most commonly charcoal or pencil but also various forms of blotted and rolled ink, chalk, wax, and many other substances. For all its simplicity, the  technique can be used to produce blur-free images of minuscule elevations and depressions on areas of any size in a way that can hardly be matched by even the most elaborate, state-of-the-art methods. In this way, surface elevations measuring only a few thousandths of a millimeter can be made visible.

Common uses for this technique include:
 Brass rubbing, to make copies of monumental brasses
 Forensic uses, including finding out what was written on a sheet of paper removed from a pad by rubbing the impressions left on subsequent sheets or other backing materials
 Frottage, a surrealist art form
 Stone rubbing, to make copies of patterns and inscriptions of gravestones or other incised or textured stone surfaces

References

External links

Artistic techniques
Forensic techniques